Stresow is a railway station in the Spandau district of Berlin, named after the Stresow neighbourhood east of the Havel river.

History

The station opened on 15 December 1846 on the railway line from Berlin's Hamburger Bahnhof to the city of Hamburg. Then the main station in the area, it bore the name Spandau. When in 1871 the parallel railway line from the Lehrter Bahnhof in Berlin to Lehrte opened with a second station west of the Havel river, the name Spandau received the addition of Hamburger Bahnhof to distinguish it from the new station called Lehrter Bahnhof. As both lines were nationalised by the Prussian state railways in 1880 and 1884, the former Lehrter Bahnhof was closed for passenger service and became a freight-only station. Named Spandau Hauptbahnhof (main station) from 1911 and Berlin-Spandau from 1936, the station was renamed Stresow on 19 May 1997, when the Spandau-West station at the site of the historic Lehrter Bahnhof took over the name of Berlin-Spandau.

An S-Bahn station from 1928, service was interrupted in 1980 and not resumed until 30 December 1998, when the station reopened in its current form. The entrance building from 1846 is preserved in its original condition and is one of the oldest in Germany.

References

External links 

Stresow
Stresow
Railway stations in Germany opened in 1846
1846 establishments in Prussia